Fred Louis Lerch (28 March 1902 – 26 August 1985) was an Austrian actor who was a star of German films. From 1951 till 1961 he worked again for German cinema as a production manager.

Selected filmography
 The Portrait (1923)
 A Waltz by Strauss (1925)
 Carmen (1926)
 The Young Man from the Ragtrade (1926)
 Flirtation (1927)
 The Family without Morals (1927)
 The Prince's Child (1927)
 Sealed Lips (1927)
 Mariett Dances Today (1928)
 Rutschbahn (1928)
 The Little Slave (1928)
 Parisiennes (1928)
 Mary Lou (1928)
 Fair Game (1928)
 Black Forest Girl (1929)
 The Crimson Circle (1929)
 Play Around a Man (1929)
 Der Walzerkönig (1930)
 Student Life in Merry Springtime (1931)

References

External links
 

1902 births
1989 deaths
Austrian male film actors
Austrian male silent film actors
People from Mistelbach District
20th-century Austrian male actors